Jahangiri-ye Olya (also Romanized as Jahāngīrī-ye ‘Olyā; also known as Jahāngīrī-ye Bālā) is a village in Buzi Rural District, in the Central District of Shadegan County, Khuzestan Province, Iran. At the 2006 census, its population was 157, in 30 families.

References 

Populated places in Shadegan County